"Do Everything" is a song by American CCM singer Steven Curtis Chapman. The song was released as the lead single from Chapman's seventeenth studio album, Re:creation.

Composition
"Do Everything" is a Contemporary Christian song with a length of three minutes and fifty-two seconds.

Charts

Weekly charts

Year-end charts

References 

2011 singles
Contemporary Christian songs
2011 songs
Sparrow Records singles